Vicia orobus is a species of leguminous plant in the genus Vicia, known as wood bitter-vetch. It is found in Atlantic areas of Europe, especially in the rocky edges of seasonally-grazed fields. Its flowers are white with purple veins, and are borne in groups of 6 or more.

Description
Its leaves are paripinnate, with 6–15 pairs of leaflets on each leaf. The flowers are borne in groups of 6–20.

V. orobus can be distinguished from other species of Vicia occurring in the British Isles by a number of characters. It is one of three species to lack tendrils (the others being V. lathyroides and V. faba), with the leaves terminating instead in a short point. The lack of tendrils is thought to represent a primitive state within the genus Vicia.

Distribution

In Great Britain, V. orobus has a westerly distribution, and is extinct in South East England. Its stronghold is in central and north-western Wales.

In Ireland, V. orobus is declining in numbers, and has been found recently at fewer than a dozen sites, most of which hold very small populations. It is therefore accorded legal protection in the Republic of Ireland, under the Flora (Protection) Order 1999.

In continental Europe, V. orobus is replaced to the east by V. cassubica, with the division between the two species running through central France. It is present as a native species in Switzerland, where it is the only truly Atlantic species.

Habitat
Vicia orobus is found in a variety of sites, including the edges of woods, on heaths, in meadows or in rocky places over limestone. In Great Britain, it is frequently found at the edges of fields where sheep are grazed in winter, but a hay crop is grown in summer. It is threatened by both overgrazing and undergrazing, as well as other activities, such as grassland improvement and land reclamation. V. orobus flowers from May to July and is pollinated by bees.

Many species are associated with V. orobus in Great Britain, including Alchemilla glabra, Carex pallescens, Genista anglica, Pseudorchis albida, Rhinanthus minor, Stachys officinalis and Viola lutea. At some sites in Ireland, V. orobus is associated with species such as Dryas octopetala, Sesleria albicans and Geranium sanguineum, which are characteristic of the flora of the Burren, although V. orobus does not occur in the Burren, or in floristically similar regions nearby.

Taxonomy
Vicia orobus was first described by Augustin Pyramus de Candolle in the 1815 work . It is classified in the section Vicia sect. Cassubicae, alongside species such as V. cassubica, V. megalotropis and its likely sister species, V. sparsiflora.

References

External links

orobus
Flora of Europe
Plants described in 1815